Saint Aerdeyrn ( century) was a semi-legendary pre-congregational saint of Wales.
He was a descendant of Vortigern, making him related to the royal house of Powys. He was the brother of Saint Edeyrn and Elldeyrn with whom he is oft associated. His name was derived from the Celtic word for Prince. He built churches in Glamorgan and he is the patron Saint of Llanelldeyrn, Wales.

References

Medieval Welsh saints
5th-century Welsh people
5th-century births
Welsh Roman Catholic saints
Year of birth unknown
Year of death unknown